Cooee and the Echo is a 1912 Australian silent film directed by Alfred Rolfe. It is considered a lost film.

Plot
In northern Queensland, a young miner is determined to avenge the murder of his brother by another miner. He falls in love with the daughter of the mine manager but discovers she is being pursued also by his brother's killer. The climax involves a knife fight involving the hero, and the hero's aboriginal friend, Yacka (Charles Woods), coming to the rescue. Another highlight was a scene with a person on horseback jumping off a bridge into the water.

Cast
Ethel Phillips
Stanley Walpole
Charles Villiers
Charles Woods as Yacka
Faithful Geebung

Original play

Edward William O'Sullivan wrote a play called Cooee, or Wild Days in the Australian Bush but it appears to have a very different plot.

Production
The film was shot near Sydney with bush scenes in the National Park. It was the first feature film definitely known to be shot by A. O. Segerberg.

Reception
One critic said of the film that "the bush in all its picturesqueness and grandeur was brought vividly to the eyes with astounding clearness and fidelity as to details."

References

External links
 
Coo-ee and the Echo at AustLit
Coo-ee play at AustLit
Coo-ee and the Echo at National Film and Sound Archive

Australian black-and-white films
Lost Australian films
1912 films
Australian silent feature films
Australian films based on plays
Films directed by Alfred Rolfe